A magic item is an object that has magical powers.

Magic item may also refer to:

 Magic item (Dungeons & Dragons)
 Magical objects in Harry Potter